Charles Russell "Charlie" Miller (born November 17, 1967) is a United States Army major general who has served as Director, Strategy, Plans and Policy of the Army Staff since July 2022. He most recently served as the Director for Plans, Policy, Strategy, and Capabilities of the United States European Command from July 2020 to June 2022, and prior to that, he served as the Deputy Director of Joint Strategic Planning, Strategy, Plans, and Policy of the Joint Staff from July 2019 to July 2020.

Education
Born in Staunton, Virginia and raised in the Shenandoah Valley, Miller earned a Bachelor of Science degree from the United States Military Academy in 1990. He later continued his education at the School of International and Public Affairs at Columbia University while serving as an instructor, and briefly as an assistant professor of political science, at the United States Military Academy. Miller received a Master of International Affairs degree focusing on international security policy and Latin America in 1999, an Master of Philosophy degree in international relations and American politics in 2000 and a Doctor of Philosophy degree in international relations and American politics in 2002. His doctoral thesis was entitled "Serving Two Masters: Doctrinal Evolution in the 20th Century US Army". His thesis advisors were Robert Jervis and Richard Betts.

Military career
From 2005 to 2007, Miller served as a strategic planner on the Joint Staff. Respected as an analyst, he was sought out by more senior officers like General David Petraeus for advice. From 2007 to 2008, he served as a deputy director on Petraeus' staff in Iraq.

From 2008 to 2009, Miller served as a senior advisor to Chairman of the Joint Chiefs of Staff Michael Mullen. From 2009 to 2011, he served on the U.S. National Security Council as Director for Iraq. Miller was one of the first fellows at the Center for International Security and Cooperation (CISAC) at Stanford University. He later worked as a senior advisor to Chairman of the Joint Chiefs of Staff Martin Dempsey.

In January 2022, Miller was reassigned to the Army Staff as the Director, Strategy, Plans and Policy, replacing Major General Bradley Gericke.

References

1967 births
Living people
People from Staunton, Virginia
United States Military Academy alumni
School of International and Public Affairs, Columbia University alumni
United States Military Academy faculty
Recipients of the Legion of Merit
United States Army generals
Recipients of the Defense Superior Service Medal